Ceramiales is an order of red algae. It was established by Friedrich Oltmanns in 1904.

Families 
 Callithamniaceae Kützing, 1843
 Ceramiaceae Dumortier, 1822
 Choreocolacaceae Sturch
 Dasyaceae Kützing, 1843
 Delesseriaceae Bory, 1828
 Inkyuleeaceae H.-G. Choi, Kraft, H.-S. Kim, Guiry et G.W. Saunders, 2008
 Rhodomelaceae J.E. Areschoug, 1847
 Sarcomeniaceae Womersley, 2003
 Spyridiaceae J. Agardh, 1851
 Wrangeliaceae J. Agardh, 1851

References

External links 

 
Red algae orders